Kilambakkam is a suburban locality in Chennai, Tamil Nadu, India. It is located between Vandalur and Urapakkam along Grand Southern Trunk Road (GST Road). It is the entrance gateway for the Chennai City from the southern end. CMDA is constructing a bus terminus for South bound buses and Extension of Metro Rail Phase 1 of Chennai Metro Rail Limited.

Developments 
Due to heavy congestion in Chennai Mofussil Bus Terminus in Koyambedu and High traffic within Chennai City, CMDA has planned to construct a satellite bus terminus on the outskirts of Chennai.

All the buses bounding to southern districts will departs from the proposed Kilambakkam Mofussil Bus Terminus (KMBT) and also halts at this place instead of plying towards CMBT in Koyambedu. The new bus terminus will be located very close to Chennai Arignar Anna Zoological Park in Vandalur.

Chennai Metro Rail Limited also announced the extension of Corridor 1 in Chennai Metro Rail Phase I from Airport to Kilambakkam via Pallavaram, Tambaram, Perungalathur and Vandalur to connect the areas within the city to the proposed new bus terminus. Chennai Airport - Kilambakkam metro line project is under active consideration of the State Government of Tamil Nadu.

The neighborhoods of Kilambakkam are served by Vandalur Railway Station of the Chennai Suburban Railway Network.

References 

Chennai